is a throw in judo. It is one of the original 40 throws of Judo as developed by Kano Jigoro. It belongs to the third group of the traditional throwing list in the Gokyo no waza of the Kodokan Judo.

Technique Description
Similar to Osoto Gari, but instead of trapping the uke's leading leg and throwing him directly to his rear, Ashi Guruma is executed by trapping the uke's trailing leg to make his torso twist and fall about an oblique axis formed by the tori's tripping leg.

See also
The Canon Of Judo

References

 Ohlenkamp, Neil (2006) Judo Unleashed basic reference on judo. .

External links 

 "JudoInfo.com" Animations and drawings
 "Judoschool.org" Collection of Ashi Guruma Videos

Judo technique
Throw (grappling)
Grappling hold
Grappling positions
Martial art techniques